Blissed Out is a compilation album by Dum Dum Girls, released on July 13, 2010 by Art Fag. The album contains various pre-Sub Pop original recordings and covers, compiled together for the first time. It was released only on blue, red, pink and grey cassettes that were limited to 400 pressings, which sold out.

The cover is a screenshot from a German soft porno called Schulmädchen.

Track listing
All songs written by Dee Dee except where noted.

References

2010 compilation albums
Dum Dum Girls albums